Paphiopedilum subgenus Megastaminodium is a subgenus of the orchid genus Paphiopedilum. It was erected to accommodate the single species Paphiopedilum canhii due to its distinct characteristics that made it unfit for the other subgenera. Its placement has since been backed by cytological, molecular and micromorphological evidence.

Distribution

Plants from this subgenus are found in rocky limestone massifs situated in the Kasi district of Vientiane Province of central Laos and a second population 180 km NNW in North-Vietnam at the Laotian border.

Species
Paphiopedilum subgenus Megastaminodium comprises the following species:

References

Orchid subgenera
Monotypic plant taxa